Montmorot is a commune in the Jura department in Bourgogne-Franche-Comté in eastern France. It is a western suburb of Lons-le-Saunier.

Geography 
The Vallière flows west through the southern part of the commune and crosses the town.

Population

Notable people
 Agustín Fernando Muñoz y Sánchez, 1st Duke of Riánsares,  morganitic husband of the Queen-Regent of Spain Maria Christina of the Two Sicilies, Duke of Rianzarès, was named Duke of Montmorot by Louis-Philippe I in 1847. The title is still honoured in Spain.

See also 
 Communes of the Jura department

References 

Communes of Jura (department)